The Kyoto City Archaeological Museum (京都市考古資料館) is located in Kyoto and showcases the city's archaeological findings. The building was constructed in 1914.

A part of its exhibit are replicas of the golden tea utensils of the 16th century Golden Tea Room.

References

External links 

 Official homepage

Archaeological museums in Japan
Infrastructure completed in 1914
Museums in Kyoto
City museums in Japan